Dolce Vita is a lifestyle information television programme airing on Television Broadcasts Limited in Hong Kong.  The lifestyle programme features fine dining, fashion, watches, cars, art, architecture, gadgets, and other things related to luxury lifestyle. The show also interviews local and visiting artists, celebrities, chefs, and designers.  Most of the show's episodes are shot in Hong Kong but the show has previously traveled to other locations in the world, including Switzerland, Maldives, and the PRC.

The show is currently hosted by Desmond So (aka Dez), Veronica Shiu, Linna Huynh, Joyce Ngai, Fei Wu, and Ivy Liu.  Previous hosts include Kelly Cheung, Eliza Sam, Jennifer Shum, Rabeea Yeung, Lorea Solabarrieta, Aimee Chan, Vaneese Toses, Jason Chan, Winnie Young, Francis Chan, Vincent Wan (Vinny), Becky Lee, Mizuni Hung, Rani Samtani, Nelson Siu, Hilda Chan, Sarah Song, Marcus Kwok, Freeyon Chung, Ting-fung Wong, and Candice Chiu.

The show currently airs in English 9:00pm every Thursday and reruns at various times during the week on TVB Pearl. The show also airs in Cantonese on TVB's News and Finance Channel.

Interviewees

References

External links
Official Website 

TVB original programming
English-language television shows
2006 Hong Kong television series debuts